Spatial planning mediates between the respective claims on space of the state, market, and community. In so doing, three different mechanisms of involving stakeholders, integrating sectoral policies and promoting development projects mark the three schools of transformative strategy formulation, innovation action and performance in spatial planning 

Spatial planning systems refer to the methods and approaches used by the public and private sector to influence the distribution of people and activities in spaces of various scales. Spatial planning can be defined as the coordination of practices and policies affecting spatial organization. Spatial planning is synonymous with the practices of urban planning in the United States but at larger scales and the term is often used in reference to planning efforts in European countries. Discrete professional disciplines which involve spatial planning include land use, urban, regional, transport and environmental planning.  Other related areas are also important, including economic and community planning, as well as maritime spatial planning.  Spatial planning takes place on local, regional, national and inter-national levels and often results in the creation of a spatial plan.

An early definition of spatial planning comes from the European Regional/Spatial Planning Charter (often called the 'Torremolinos Charter'), adopted in 1983 by the European Conference of Ministers responsible for Regional Planning (CEMAT): "Regional/spatial planning gives geographical expression to the economic, social, cultural and ecological policies of society. It is at the same time a scientific discipline, an administrative technique and a policy developed as an interdisciplinary and comprehensive approach directed towards a balanced regional development and the physical organisation of space according to an overall strategy."

Numerous planning systems exist around the world. The form of planning largely diverges and co-evolves with societies and their governance systems. Every country, and states within those countries, have a unique planning systems that is made up by different actors, different planning perspectives and a particular institutional framework. Perspectives, actors and institutions change over time, influencing both the form and the impact of spatial planning. Especially in Northwestern Europe spatial planning has evolved greatly since the late 1950s. Until the 1990s, the term ‘spatial’ was used primarily to refer to the way that planning should deal with more than simply zoning, land use planning, or the design of the physical form of cities or regions, but also should address the more complex issues of the spatial relationship of activities such as employment, homes and leisure uses.

Spatial planning systems in Europe 

Various compendia of spatial planning systems can be found. Below is a table showing some of the main sources, the countries covered and the date of publication.

European spatial planning

In 1999, a document called the European Spatial Development Perspective (ESDP) was signed by the ministers responsible for regional planning in the EU member states. Although the ESDP has no binding status, and the European Union has no formal authority for spatial planning, the ESDP has influenced spatial planning policy in European regions and member states, and placed the coordination of EU sectoral policies on the political agenda.

At the European level, the term territorial cohesion is becoming more widely used and is for example mentioned in the draft EU Treaty (Constitution) as a shared competency of the European Union; it is also included in the Treaty of Lisbon. The term was defined in a "scoping document" in Rotterdam in late 2004 and is being elaborated further using empirical data from the ESPON programme in a document entitled "The Territorial State and Perspectives of the European Union".  At the minister's conference in May 2007 in Leipzig, a political document called the "Territorial Agenda" was signed to continue the process begun in Rotterdam, revised in May 2011 in Gödöllő.

See also

 Architecture
 Comprehensive planning
 European Spatial Development Perspective
 Geography
 ISOCARP - International Society of City and Regional Planners
 Landscape architecture
 Land use planning
 Location theory
 Permeability (spatial and transport planning)
 Principles of Intelligent Urbanism
 Regional planning
 Spatial Citizenship
 Territorial spatial planning
 Unified settlement planning
 Urban planning
 Urban sprawl

References

 Andreas Faludi, Bas Waterhout, The Making of the European Spatial Development Perspective, London Routledge 2002. .
 Gerhard Larsson, Spatial Planning Systems in Western Europe - An Overview, Delft Univ Press (2006), .
 Gerhard Larsson, Land management as Public Policy, University Press of America (2010), . 
 UNECE, [http://www.unece.org/press/pr2008/08env_p04e.htm Spatial Planning - Key Instrument for Development and Effective Governance with Special Reference to Countries in Transition], Report ECE/HBP/146, Geneva UNECE 2008.
 Richard H. Williams, European union spatial policy and planning'', London Chapman 1996. .

External links

 CEMAT - European Conference of Ministers responsible for Regional Planning
 EJSD - European Journal of Spatial Development
 ESPON - European Observation Network on Territorial Development and Cohesion
 Planum - The European Journal of Planning
 VASAB - Vision and Strategies around the Baltic Sea - Baltic Sea Region intergovernmental cooperation in spatial planning and development

Spatial planning